Spinal Tap (stylized as Spın̈al Tap, with a dotless letter i and a metal umlaut over the n) is a fictional English heavy metal band created by the American comedians and musicians of The T.V. Show who wrote and performed original songs as the band: Michael McKean, as the lead singer and guitarist David St. Hubbins; Christopher Guest, as the guitarist Nigel Tufnel; and Harry Shearer, as the bassist Derek Smalls. They are characterized as "one of England's loudest bands". 

Spinal Tap first appeared on the 1979 ABC television sketch comedy pilot The T.V. Show, starring Rob Reiner. The sketch, actually a mock promotional video for the song "Rock and Roll Nightmare", was written by Reiner and the band, and included the songwriter-performer Loudon Wainwright III on keyboards. The band starred in the 1984 mockumentary film This Is Spinal Tap, which was accompanied by a soundtrack album. 

In the years following the film's release, the actors have portrayed the band members at concerts and released music under the Spinal Tap name.

The trio also portray the fictional American folk music revival band the Folksmen; some Spinal Tap concert appearances have featured Guest, McKean and Shearer opening for Spinal Tap as the Folksmen.

History

Fictional history
 
Although the 1984 film portrays the band hailing from the United Kingdom, the three actors who play the principal band members—Guest, McKean and Shearer—were born in the United States. Guest was, however, raised in both the U.S. and Britain, and would later be granted dual citizenship and an inherited title of nobility as the 5th Baron Haden-Guest. David Kaff (as keyboardist "Viv Savage") and R. J. Parnell (as drummer "Mick Shrimpton"), who have smaller roles in the film, are both British.

Fans of Spinal Tap have assembled details about the band based on fictional film, albums, concerts and related promotional material, including a discography and a list of the band's former members. Within the context of the band's fictional history, Spinal Tap began as a skiffle band called the Thamesmen in the early 1960s, before changing their name to Spinal Tap. In the late '60s, Spinal Tap was a psychedelic pop band, and has also performed progressive rock, jazz fusion, funk and reggae, but is best known as a heavy metal band. Spinal Tap has also been classified as hard rock, glam metal and rock and roll.

Spinal Tap's fictional history includes a succession of drummers, all of whom are said to have died in strange circumstances: one in a "bizarre gardening accident"; another who "choked on vomit", but possibly not his own vomit; and two from "spontaneous human combustion" onstage. Additionally, it is claimed that police described one of the deaths as a mystery "best left unsolved".

Real history
The band Spinal Tap first appeared in a video aired as part of a 1979 sketch comedy special called The T.V. Show, a project spearheaded by Rob Reiner and Michael McKean. The video was for the song "Rock 'N' Roll Nightmare", in a sequence that was intended as a spoof of The Midnight Special. Participating in the video (and playing the music) were Michael McKean, Christopher Guest, Harry Shearer, Loudon Wainwright III, and Russ Kunkel; the segment was introduced by Reiner in character as Wolfman Jack. The Spinal Tap band members were at this point unnamed. McKean and Shearer had previously been members of the Credibility Gap, a comedy troupe that did both spoken word and musical comedy, and had released a mini rock opera and at least one musical 7-inch single.

Also in 1979, Guest and McKean were members of Lenny and the Squigtones, a band that was fronted by characters from the hit television series Laverne and Shirley. Guest, on guitar and clarinet, was credited as "Nigel Tufnel", the name he would eventually use as a member of Spinal Tap.

The appearance on The T.V. Show eventually led to the creation of a film, tracing a disastrous tour undertaken by the aging British metal band Spinal Tap. Reiner hosted the film in the character of filmmaker "Marty DiBergi", while Guest, McKean and Shearer took on character names for the project, and further developed their Spinal Tap personas. (Respectively, Guest was guitarist "Nigel Tufnel"; McKean was vocalist "David St. Hubbins"; and Shearer was bassist "Derek Smalls".) Also added to the group were David Kaff (as keyboard player "Viv Savage") and R.J. Parnell (as drummer "Mick Shrimpton"). Parnell had previously been in the band Atomic Rooster, while Kaff had been a member of Rare Bird. The quintet played their own instruments throughout the film.

The band Spinal Tap became a going concern, with the group (in character) playing gigs and appearing on a 1984 episode of Saturday Night Live to promote the film. The character of Mick Shrimpton having died in the film, Parnell played his "twin brother" drummer Ric Shrimpton for these and later appearances.

Reunion and recent history

The group reformed on January 18, 1991, for a performance at the Disneyland Hotel that included new material. This featured on the 1992 release, Break Like the Wind, an album produced in part by T-Bone Burnett. The album was accompanied by a  promotional audition for a new drummer attended by Stephen Perkins of Jane's Addiction, Gina Schock of The Go-Go's, and Mick Fleetwood of Fleetwood Mac, who auditioned in a fireproof suit. Despite the auditions, Parnell was retained as "Ric Shrimpton" and remained the band's drummer. Kaff did not return, and consequently the "reunited" band now consisted of Guest, McKean, Shearer and Parnell (all in character) and new keyboardist C. J. Vanston (under his own name). A promotional concert tour followed, which included an appearance at The Freddie Mercury Tribute Concert, where they performed "The Majesty of Rock", a song they dedicated to Mercury.

The band also released the single "Bitch School", which became a genuine chart single in the UK, as did follow-up single "The Majesty of Rock".

The band also appeared on The Simpsons in the episode “The Otto Show”, which aired in the United States on April 23, 1992.  The episode was written by Jeff Martin and directed by Wes Archer. Harry Shearer, who is a regular Simpsons cast member, reprised his role as Derek Smalls.

On July 1, 1992, Tap crossed five time zones for three performances in St. John's, Newfoundland; Barrie, Ontario; and Vancouver, British Columbia, for MuchMusic and Molson's Great Canadian Party. For each performance of "Stonehenge", the miniature monument prop was delivered on stage in a courier envelope.

Parnell dropped out of the group in the 1990s, leaving Spinal Tap to use session drummers.

In 2000, the band launched a web site named "Tapster", where their song "Back from the Dead" was made available for download. Tapster was a parody of Napster, a peer-to-peer file sharing network.

In 2001, the band "reunited" for the nine-city "Back from the Dead Tour" that began on June 1, 2001, at the Greek Theater in Los Angeles. The tour included a show at Carnegie Hall in New York City and ended in Montreal in mid-July at the Just for Laughs festival. The opening act for some of these shows were the Folksmen, the folk trio seen in the film A Mighty Wind, and also performed by Guest, McKean, and Shearer.

In 2007, Tap reunited again, this time to help combat global warming. "They're not that environmentally conscious, but they've heard of global warming," said Marty DeBergi (portrayed by Reiner). "Nigel thought it was just because he was wearing too much clothing – that if he just took his jacket off it would be cooler." This reunion also included the release of a new song called "Warmer Than Hell". The band played on the London leg of the SOS/Live Earth concert series, and Rob Reiner has directed a short film (entitled Spinal Tap) which was released on the Live Earth website on April 27. The film reveals that Nigel Tufnel is now working as a farmhand looking after miniature horses. He plans to race them. David St. Hubbins is currently working as a hip-hop producer, and Derek Smalls is in rehab for being addicted to the Internet.

A new album, Back from the Dead, was released on June 16, 2009. The album consists mostly of re-recordings of songs from the original film's soundtrack, as they would have sounded had they really existed and been recorded in a studio.

On April 6, 2009, the band announced a one-date "world tour", performing at London's Wembley Arena on June 30, 2009. Support on this night came from the Folksmen. The band unexpectedly also self-confirmed for Glastonbury Festival 2009 during an online interview on May 8, 2009, in the Philadelphia Daily News following a "Unwigged and Unplugged" show in the city.

It has been announced that they will reunite at the 2019 Tribeca Film Festival for the 35th anniversary of the film.

Other appearances

The band appeared as the musical guests on an episode of Saturday Night Live (SNL) in the spring of 1984. Barry Bostwick was the host. At this time, producer Dick Ebersol approached Shearer, Guest and McKean to join the cast. Shearer and Guest accepted (McKean would not join until ten years later, by which time original producer Lorne Michaels was back at the show's helm). Shearer's stint on SNL the following season—his second, the first having been the 1979–80 season—was to be short-lived, following creative disputes with the show's management.

In 1985, at the invitation of Ronnie James Dio, Michael McKean and Harry Shearer took part in the heavy metal benefit project Hear 'n Aid, to raise money for famine victims in Ethiopia. McKean and Shearer attended the event in character as David St. Hubbins and Derek Smalls, appearing in the behind-the-scenes videos and interacting in character with many real-life metal stars, many of whom were huge fans of Spinal Tap. "David St. Hubbins" and "Derek Smalls" are part of the vocal chorus heard on the record (and seen in the video), and are credited under those names on the Hear 'n Aid single's front cover (alongside many real-life heavy metal stars).  The ad hoc supergroup's single "Stars" rose to No. 26 on the UK charts in May 1986.

As part of the promotion surrounding Break Like the Wind, Spinal Tap was portrayed in "The Otto Show" episode of the animated series The Simpsons, for which Shearer is a principal voice actor. The Simpsons follows the approach of the original film by presenting the group as if they were a real group. During the disastrous performance, a massive devil balloon on the stage does not inflate properly, and Nigel is temporarily blinded by lasers. Later in the episode, their tour bus is accidentally pushed off a cliff due to Otto's reckless driving. In a 2016 interview Shearer said this was the only time Spinal Tap had worked to a script, all other movie, television and live appearances being improvised.

On July 1, 1992, as part of MuchMusic's Canada Day "Great Canadian Party" festival, Spinal Tap completed an unprecedented tour of Canada in less than 24 hours. Jetting across five time-zones, the band played St. John's, Newfoundland, Barrie, Ontario, and Vancouver, British Columbia. That evening, during a performance of "Stonehenge", Tap received their signature, triptych set-piece via Canada Post in a small, bubble-wrap envelope that Derek Smalls signed for onstage. Bemused, Smalls tore open the packaging, and revealed to the cheering crowd the prop which looked to be half the size of the original 18 inch Stonehenge rock from the film.

In 1993, Nigel Tufnel appeared in the rockumentary Joe Satriani: The Satch Tapes.

In 1994, The Return of Spinal Tap was released on video; most of this was live material from a 1992 performance at the Royal Albert Hall where the Stonehenge set was shown to the audience on video as being too big to fit through the stage doors, but it also included some interviews and follow-up on the band members.

In 2000, while promoting Tapster.com, Spinal Tap appeared and performed on the short-lived series VH1 The List (with Mick Fleetwood on drums) and appeared on the Late Show.

In 2006, Nigel Tufnel appeared in a Volkswagen TV commercial highlighting their offer of a free, exclusive First Act guitar with the purchase of qualifying automobiles. The guitar features knobs and inlays with the Volkswagen logo and pre-amps that allow it to be played through the car's stereo system. Also in 2006, the song "Gimme Some Money" was used in a TV commercial  for Open from American Express, "Tonight I'm Gonna Rock You Tonight" appeared in Harmonix's video game Guitar Hero 2 and "Christmas with the Devil" appeared in BBC One promo spots for the network's Christmas program.

In 2007, while accepting an award from the BBC Two program The Culture Show, Christopher Guest broke into Nigel Tufnel, and considered what his wife and kids would make of the Mark Kermode-shaped award.

On July 7, 2007, Spinal Tap played at Wembley Stadium in London along with many major bands and groups as part of Live Earth, a Climate Change awareness concert. Their set included a new song written for the occasion, "Warmer Than Hell". During their final number, the song "Big Bottom", St. Hubbins and Tufnel both picked up basses. Spinal Tap was also joined by "every bass player in the known universe", including Nate Mendel (of the Foo Fighters); Robert Trujillo, Kirk Hammett, and James Hetfield (Metallica); Gordon Moakes (Bloc Party); and Adam Yauch (a.k.a. MCA), of Beastie Boys. They were also joined on back-up vocals by Annette O'Toole, Michael McKean's wife.

In May 2008, Nigel Tufnel appeared in the National Geographic show Stonehenge Decoded, expounding his nonsensical theories about Stonehenge and who was responsible for building it. His claims to have invented "decoder" experiments capable of unveiling the true purpose of the monument are, as yet, unproven.

McKean, Guest and Shearer have made several appearances as their alter egos the Folksmen, including the television shows Saturday Night Live and Mad TV and the film The Return of Spinal Tap.

On March 2, 2009, Guest, McKean and Shearer held a press conference at the House of Blues in Los Angeles to announce their forthcoming album of new and old Spinal Tap songs, plus a 2009 "Unwigged & Unplugged" tour to celebrate the 25th anniversary of the film, This Is Spinal Tap. According to an L.A. Weekly report, when MTV News' Kurt Loder asked the trio "if they had plans beyond an album and tour, Shearer answered, 'We're gonna bomb Iran.'" The tour also features songs from the Folksmen and others from throughout the trio's career.

On April 1, 2009, Guest, McKean, and Shearer played on The Tonight Show with Jay Leno as the musical guest.

On June 15, 2009, Spinal Tap performed on The Tonight Show with Conan O'Brien as the musical guest.

On Saturday, June 27, 2009, Spinal Tap performed on the main stage at the Glastonbury Festival with Jarvis Cocker guesting on bass during "Big Bottom," and also inviting Jamie Cullum on stage to play keyboards. One of the unexpected highlights for Tap fans was a rendition of the newly written overture from the mythical Jack the Ripper musical Saucy Jack. Also on the bill were Kasabian, Crosby Stills & Nash, and Bruce Springsteen.

On Tuesday, June 30, 2009, Spinal Tap performed at Wembley Arena with the Folksmen as support. A variety of special guests featured including Keith Emerson (joined them on organ/keyboards – which he later destroyed during the show), Justin Hawkins from the Darkness and others.

On July 27, 2009, the band performed on Late Night with Jimmy Fallon as the musical guest announcing their retirement and shortly thereafter their comeback.

The next day, Tuesday, July 28, 2009, they were the musical guest on The Daily Show with Jon Stewart.

On August 25, 2009, Spinal Tap released a seven-minute short film titled Stonehenge: 'Tis a Magical Place celebrating their 25th anniversary. The video is distributed through INgrooves and is available only on iTunes. The short film depicts the founding members of Spinal Tap making a pilgrimage to Stonehenge for the first time.

On October 18, 2022, Spinal Tap star Michael McKean deleted scene from the movie on his Twitter account and added: "Wow, thanks. Unseen by me, anyway, Lo these many years."

Band members

Current members
 David St. Hubbins ( by Michael McKean) – lead vocals, rhythm & lead guitar, acoustic guitar, bass guitar (1964–present)
 Nigel Tufnel (portrayed by Christopher Guest) – lead guitar, backing & lead vocals, bass guitar, piano, violin, violin bow, mandolin (1964–present)
 Derek Smalls (portrayed by Harry Shearer) – bass guitar, backing & lead vocals (1967–present)
 "Caucasian" Jeffery Vanston (portrayed by C. J. Vanston) – keyboards, backing vocals
 Gregg Bissonette (as himself) – drums, percussion

Former members
This list contains both fictional former members of Spinal Tap and celebrities that have played with the band.

Guitar, backing vocals
 "Ricky from San Francisco" (1982)
 Rhyan Gordon (1992) also played baseball bat

Keyboards, backing vocals
 Jan van der Kvelk (1965)
 Tony Brixton (1965–1966)
 Nick Wax (1965–1966)
 Dicky Laine (1965–1966)
 Denny Upham (1966–1968)
 Ross MacLochness (1974–1975)
 Viv Savage (David Kaff) (1975–198?) also played keyboard bass. Savage was allegedly killed when he went to visit the grave of former drummer, Mick Shrimpton, whose grave exploded due to methane gas build-up.
 John Sinclair (1982)
 Jon Carin (Amnesty International performance in 1991)
 Jamie Cullum (Glastonbury 2009)
 Keith Emerson (Wembley Arena, June 30, 2009)

Bass guitar, backing vocals
 Ronnie Pudding (1964–1967) (Portrayed by Danny Kortchmar)
 Danny Jarman (1967)
 David Gilmour (Amnesty International performance in 1991)
 Tim Renwick (Amnesty International performance in 1991)
 Pino Palladino (Amnesty International performance in 1991)
 Cody Wheaton
 Jarvis Cocker (Glastonbury 2009)

Drums, percussion
 Actual
Ric Parnell (This Is Spinal Tap, 1984 album; Break Like the Wind, 1992 album; died 2022)
Gary Wallis (Amnesty International performance in 1991) (Wallis pretended to explode at the end of the performance)
Jody Linscott (Amnesty International performance in 1991)
Mick Fleetwood (2000)
Todd Sucherman (2009)
Gregg Bissonette (2009)
 Fictional and deceased
John "Stumpy" Pepys (1964–1966) (Portrayed by Ed Begley Jr. in the video "Gimme Some Money"). Died in a bizarre gardening accident that the authorities said was "best left unsolved."
Eric "Stumpy Joe" Childs (1966–1967). Choked on vomit of unknown origin, perhaps but not necessarily his own, because "you can't really dust for vomit." The name is an homage to "Curly Joe" DeRita of the Three Stooges.
Peter "James" Bond (1967–1977) (Portrayed by Russ Kunkel whose character was mistakenly credited as the name of the previous drummer). Spontaneously combusted on stage during a jazz-blues or blues-jazz festival on the Isle of Lucy, leaving behind what has been described alternately as a "globule" or a "stain".
Mick Shrimpton (1977–1982) (Portrayed by R. J. "Ric" Parnell). Exploded onstage.
Joe "Mama" Besser (1982) (Portrayed by Fred Asparagus). Claimed he "couldn't take this  shit"; according to an MTV interview with Spinal Tap in November 1991, he disappeared along with the equipment during their Japanese tour. He is either dead or playing jazz. The name is a reference that of Joe Besser, who similarly had a short-lived and ill-fitted stint as a member of The Three Stooges; it is also a play on the insult phrase "Yo mama".
Richard "Ric" Shrimpton (1982–1999). Allegedly sold his dialysis machine for drugs; presumed dead.
Sammy "Stumpy" Bateman (1999–2001). Died trying to jump over a tank full of sharks while on a tricycle in a freak show.
Scott "Skippy" Scuffleton (2001–2007). Fate unknown.
Chris "Poppa" Cadeau (2007–2008). Eaten by his pet python Cleopatra.
Plus nine other drummers at various times (probably between 1970 and 1981) all of whom are dead.

Tambourine
 Jeanine Pettibone (1982). After she left, Jeanine opened her own Irish clothing store named Potato Republic.
 Stewart Ikin (1982). Backing tambourine; left the band to join Creme Brulee. 
 Oliver Ridout (Amnesty International performance in 1991).
 Billy Murgatroyd (1996). Murgatroyd is the only tambourine player of the band to be killed, overdosing on coffee creamer.

Harmonica
 Little Danny Schindler (1965–1966)

Horns
 Keelan Hegarty (1965–1966).
 Geoff Clovington (1965–1966).
 Dan Taman (1967). Died while falling off a train as it was entering King's Cross station, his body was never recovered.

Backing vocals
 Lhasa Apso (1965–1966).
 Julie Scrubbs-Martin (1965–1966).
 Xof Lorac (1982–1983).
 Andy Sutcliffe (1987). Died beating himself to death with his own shoes.

Session members
 Dweezil Zappa – guitar on "Diva Fever"
 Cher – vocals on "Just Begin Again"
 Slash – guitar on "Break Like the Wind"
 Steve Lukather – guitar on "Break Like the Wind"
 Joe Satriani – guitar on "Break Like the Wind"
 Jeff Beck – guitar on "Break Like the Wind"
 Timothy B. Schmit – backing vocals on "Christmas with the Devil", "Cash on Delivery"
 Steve Vai – guitar on "Short and Sweet"
 John Mayer – guitar on "Short and Sweet"
 Phil Collen – guitar on "Short and Sweet"

Discography

Actual discography
Studio albums

Singles

Fictional discography
Studio albums

 Spinal Tap Sings "(Listen to the) Flower People" and Other Favourites (1967)
 We Are All Flower People (1968)
 Brainhammer (1970)
 Nerve Damage (1971)
 Blood to Let (1972)
 Intravenus de Milo (1974)
 The Sun Never Sweats (1975)
 Bent for the Rent (1976)
 Tap Dancing (1976)
 Rock 'n' Roll Creation (referred to as The Gospel According to Spinal Tap in the film) (1977)
 Shark Sandwich (1980)
 Smell the Glove (1982)

Live albums
 Silent but Deadly (1969)
 Jap Habit (1975)

Compilations
 The Incredible Flight of Icarus P. Anybody (1969)
 Heavy Metal Memories (1983)

Singles

 "All the Way Home" (1961) – an unreleased demo
 "Gimme Some Money" (1965)
 "(Listen to The) Flower People" (1967)
 "Breakfast of Evil" (1969)
 "Silent but Deadly" (1969)
 "Big Bottom" (1970)
 "Swallow My Love" (1970)
 "Nerve Damage" (1971)
 "Blood to Let" (1972)
 "Tonight I'm Gonna Rock You Tonight" (1974)
 "Stonehenge" (1975)
 "Nice 'n' Stinky" (1975)
 "Heavy Duty" (1976)
 "Bent for the Rent" (1976)
 "Tap Dancing" (1976)
 "Rock 'n' Roll Creation" (1977)
 "Sex Farm" (1980)
 "No Place Like Nowhere" (1980)
 "Hell Hole" (1982)

Bootlegs

 Top Hit for Nows (1968)
 Audible Death (1969)
 Live at Budokan (1975)
 Openfaced Mako (1980)
 Got Thamesmen on Tap (unknown date)
 Maximum Tap (unknown date)
 It's a Dub World (unknown date)

Unreleased/unfinished material

 Here's More Tap
 Flak Packet
 Lusty Lorry
 SEXX! (Original Motion Picture Soundtrack)
 Hernia
 Nigel Tufnel's Trilogy in D-minor, including song with the working title "Lick My Love Pump"
 David St. Hubbins' / Derek Smalls' Saucy Jack, a musical based on the life of Jack the Ripper
 The title song from the musical was released in 2009 as a free MP3 download from the official Spinal Tap website

Solo releases
 Nigel Tufnel
 Nigel Tufnel's Clam Caravan (1979)
 Pyramid Blue (unknown date)

 Derek Smalls
 It's a Smalls World (1978)
 Smalls Change Meditations Upon Ageing (2018)

 David St. Hubbins
 In Search of a Brown Note (unfinished album of jazz collaborations, c. 1984–1985)

 Ross MacLochness
 Doesn't Anybody Here Speak English? (unknown date)

References

External links

 

 
Bands with fictional stage personas
British musical trios
Comedy film characters
Comedy rock musical groups
English glam metal musical groups
English hard rock musical groups
British rock and roll music groups
Fictional musical groups
MCA Records artists
Male characters in film
British parodists
Parody musicians